"You Changed Me" is a song by American singer and actor Jamie Foxx featuring Chris Brown. It was released on March 12, 2015 as the second single from his fifth studio album Hollywood: A Story of a Dozen Roses (2015).

Music video
A music video for the song, directed by Director X, was premiered on May 29, 2015. An official behind-the-scenes video was released to Foxx's VEVO channel on June 3, 2015. Empire actress Grace Gealey made a cameo appearance as Foxx's love interest. Rapper Alexandra Reid from the South Korean Girl-Group BP Rania also makes a cameo as Chris Brown's love interest.

Charts

Release history

References 

2015 songs
Jamie Foxx songs
Chris Brown songs
RCA Records singles
Song recordings produced by Boi-1da
Song recordings produced by Vinylz
Songs written by Kevin Cossom
Songs written by Vinylz
Songs written by Chris Brown
Music videos directed by Director X